In SCSI standards for transferring data between computers and peripheral devices, often computer storage, commands are sent in a Command Descriptor Block (CDB). 

Each CDB can be a total of 6, 10, 12, or 16 bytes, but later versions of the SCSI standard also allow for variable-length CDBs. The CDB consists of a one byte operation code followed by some command-specific parameters. The parameters need not be a full byte long, and the parameter length varies from one command to another. The available commands, with links to articles describing the detailed structure of many of them, are listed in the article section List of SCSI commands.

Typical CDB structures, for the 6- and 16-byte SCSI Request Sense Command, opcode 3, are:

6-byte CDB:

16-byte CDB:

An example with different allocation of bits to parameters is the 6-byte SCSI Mode Sense Command:

The generic form of the 12-byte CDB is:

See SPC-4 (http://www.t10.org/cgi-bin/ac.pl?t=f&f=spc4r34.pdf, free registration required) for more information.

Notes

See also
 LUN

References

 

CDB